The Portugal women's national under-16 and under-17 basketball team is a national basketball team of Portugal, administered by the Portuguese Basketball Federation. It represents the country in women's international under-16 and under-17 basketball competitions.

FIBA U16 Women's European Championship participations

FIBA Under-17 Women's Basketball World Cup participations

See also
Portugal women's national basketball team
Portugal women's national under-18 basketball team
Portugal men's national under-16 basketball team

References

External links
Archived records of Portugal team participations

Basketball
Women's national under-16 basketball teams
Women's national under-17 basketball teams